John Maeke (born 6 June 1962) is a retired long distance athlete from the Solomon Islands.

Maeke was part of the Solomon Islands team that competed at the Olympics when he went to the 1988 Summer Olympics which was held in Seoul. He entered the 10,000 metres, he managed to finish 22nd in his heat so didn't manage to reach the final, he also entered the Marathon, but he didn't finish the race .

References

External links
 

1962 births
Living people
Athletes (track and field) at the 1988 Summer Olympics
Olympic athletes of the Solomon Islands
Male marathon runners
Solomon Islands male long-distance runners